The Karnataka State Film Award for Second Best Film is one of the Karnataka State Film Awards presented annually since the awards were instituted for films of 1966–67. The award is given to Kannada films produced in the year.

Winners

See also
 Karnataka State Film Award for First Best Film
 Karnataka State Film Award for Third Best Film

References

Karnataka State Film Awards